Weightlifting was contested at the 1978 Asian Games in Bangkok, Thailand. The competition included only men's events for ten different weight categories.

Medalists

Medal table

References
 Results 10 December
 Results 11 December
 Results 13 December
 Results 17 December

External links
 Results

 
1978 Asian Games events
1978
Asian Games
Asian
1978